Igor Vrablic (born 19 July 1965) is a Canadian former soccer player who played at both professional and international levels, as a striker.

Early and personal life
Vrablic was born  in Bratislava and raised in Waterloo, Ontario.

Career

Club career
Vrablic played with Kitchener Beograd at the youth level.  He was drafted in the 2nd round, 13th overall in the 1982 NASL entry draft by the Toronto Blizzard. He played in the United States, Belgium, and Greece for the Golden Bay Earthquakes, RFC Sérésien and Olympiacos. He played for the Toronto Blizzard in 1988. In 1989, Vrablic played in the National Soccer League with Toronto Panhellenic. In 1991, he continued playing in the National Soccer League with North York Atletico Argentina SC.

International career
Vrablic earned 35 caps for Canada, representing them in the 1984 Summer Olympics and 1986 FIFA World Cup. His international career was ended in 1986 when, together with three other Canadian players, he was involved in a match fixing betting scandal at the Merlion Cup tournament.

International goals

References

External links
 Igor Vrablic stats
 

1965 births
Living people
Footballers from Bratislava
Czechoslovak emigrants to Canada
Slovak emigrants to Canada
1986 FIFA World Cup players
Association football forwards
Canada men's international soccer players
Canadian expatriate soccer players
Canadian soccer players
Footballers at the 1984 Summer Olympics
North American Soccer League (1968–1984) players
North American Soccer League (1968–1984) indoor players
San Jose Earthquakes (1974–1988) players
R.F.C. Seraing (1904) players
Olympiacos F.C. players
Toronto Blizzard (1986–1993) players
North York Astros players
Olympic soccer players of Canada
Canada men's youth international soccer players
Canada men's under-23 international soccer players
Expatriate soccer players in the United States
Canadian expatriate sportspeople in the United States
Belgian Pro League players
Super League Greece players
Expatriate footballers in Belgium
Canadian expatriate sportspeople in Belgium
Expatriate footballers in Greece
Canadian expatriate sportspeople in Greece
Sportspeople involved in betting scandals
Association football controversies
CONCACAF Championship-winning players
Canadian Soccer League (1987–1992) players
Canadian National Soccer League players
Canadian people of Slovak descent